Jalan Kampung Buloh (Terengganu state route 174) is a major road in  Terengganu, Malaysia. The Memorial Batu Bersurat Terengganu, Sungai Tersat, the site of the Terengganu Inscription Stone which was discovered in 1899, is located in Sungai Tersat.

Features

Sungai Berang Bridge
The Sungai Berang Bridge or Jambatan Sungai Berang is a major bridge across the Berang River.

Memorial Batu Bersurat Terengganu, Sungai Tersat 
The Memorial Batu Bersurat Terengganu, Sungai Tersat or Terengganu Inscription Stone Memorial is a monument to commemorate the discovery of the Terengganu Inscription Stone in 1899. This memorial was officially opened on 13 April 1992 by the Menteri Besar (Chief Minister) of Terengganu at that time, Tan Sri Wan Mokhtar Ahmad.

List of junctions

Roads in Terengganu